Absys was an early declarative programming language from the University of Aberdeen.  It anticipated a number of features of Prolog such as negation as failure, aggregation operators, the 
central role of backtracking and constraint solving.  Absys was the first implementation of a logic programming language.

The name Absys was chosen as an abbreviation for Aberdeen System.

See also
ABSET

References

"ABSYS: An Incremental Compiler for Assertions", J.M. Foster et al., Mach Intell 4, Edinburgh U Press, 1969, pp. 423–429

Declarative programming languages
Prolog programming language family
Academic programming languages
Logic programming languages
Programming languages created in 1967